"Rush Hour" is an instrumental composition by Dutch disc jockey and record producer Armin van Buuren. The song was released in the Netherlands by Armind on 25 June 2007 as the only single from van Buuren's compilation A State of Trance 2007. It was the official anthem of 2007 UEFA European Under-21 Championship in the Netherlands. It exists a version of the track starting with an introduction called "Miserere".

Critical reception 
9 years after its release, Idris Jones from webmedia We Rave You affirmed that "'Rush Hour' is undoubtedly one of the most distinctive, significant and timeless Trance tracks of all time." He acclaimed "its opening atmosphere, the high tempo rhythmic percussion that underlays the rising chords set a spine tingling precedent for the remainder of the track".

Track listing 
 Netherlands – Armind – Digital download 
 "Miserere" & "Rush Hour" – 11:40
 "Rush Hour" (No Intro Edit) – 9:35

 Netherlands – Armind – 12" 
 "Miserere" & "Rush Hour" – 11:40
 "Rush Hour" (Radio Edit) – 2:53
 "Rush Hour" (No Intro Edit) - 9:35

 Netherlands – Armada – CD Single 
 "Rush Hour" (Radio Edit) – 2:53
 "Rush Hour" (Extended Mix) – 9:33

 United States – Ultra – Digital download '''
 "Rush Hour" (Radio Edit) - 2:53
 "Rush Hour" (No Intro Mix) - 9:34
 "Miserere" & "Rush Hour" - 11:40

Charts

References 

2007 singles
2007 songs
Armin van Buuren songs
Songs written by Armin van Buuren
Armada Music singles